Jaihind 2 (also known in Tamil as Arjunin Jai Hind 2 ) is a 2014 Indian action drama film produced and directed by Arjun Sarja, who also stars in the lead role. It is a sequel of the Tamil film Jai Hind and was simultaneously made in Kannada as Abhimanyu. The film focuses on India becoming a superpower, as it appeared in A. P. J. Abdul Kalam's dreams, and tries to tackle the issues in the education system. 

Jaihind 2/Abhimanyu was released on 7 November 2014 and became a commercial success in Kannada, but did not perform well in Tamil and Telugu. The film's Kannada version won the Karnataka State Film Award for Second Best Film.

Premise
Abhimanyu, a computer service engineer and martial artist gets disturbed by the money making schemes by private schools which resulted in the death of a poor child's parents and begins to fight for the children's rights to education.

Cast

Tamil version
Brahmanandam as Ezhumalai
Mayilsamy as Kulfi Gopalan 
Sampath Ram (special appearance in "Ayya Padichavare")
Scissor Manohar (special appearance in "Ayya Padichavare")
Gana Bala (special appearance in "Ayya Padichavare")
Jahangir (special appearance in "Ayya Padichavare")

Production
The movie shoot was launched on 9 June 2013 in a grand manner in Mumbai and budgeted at 20 crores. Art director, Sasidhar, erected a huge set, resembling a jail at a cost of Rs 25 lakhs. A high octane action sequence was filmed in a former army facility in Bangkok.

Soundtrack

Telugu Track listing
"Edige Ma Chinni" - Ravi Varma
"Idi Pranayama" - Karthik 
"Manasa Nee Madhurima" - Saindhavi 
"Ayya Chandruda" - Manikka Vinayagam

Release
The satellite rights of the Tamil and Kannada version were sold to Zee Tamil and Colors Kannada.

Tax Exemption Issue
The Tamil version did not get tax exemption, due to the claim that "Jai Hind" is not a Tamil word. Despite arguing to the committee members, Arjun Sarja was unsuccessful in the attempt.

Critical reception
Jaihind 2 received mixed reviews from critics.

Tamil version 

The Hindu stated "Arjunin Jai Hind 2 is the kind of film about which you shrug and say, “Well, if you liked Jai Hind…”. If you have to watch a film about a one-man army, you could do worse than watch one with Arjun in it. He totally pulls it off". The Times of India gave 2.5 stars out of 5 and wrote, "For most parts, Arjunin Jai Hind 2 plays like a collage of various Arjun films...What's interesting, however, is that instead of telling his story as a straightforward narrative, Arjun presents it as events from the lives of different individuals who come into Abhimanyu's life...The problem with the film is that it tells a predictable story and in a rather longwinded manner". 

The New Indian Express wrote, "The film conveys a relevant message, but one that could have been better executed. The saving grace is Arjun who has penned the plot and screenplay, directed and produced the film. The actor tackles his role with cool intensity. His physique well toned, the action king is a delight to watch in the fights-stunt scenes as he packs a powerful punch at his tormentors. If only his screenplay had matched the lofty message". Rediff gave 2 stars out of 5 and wrote, "Unfortunately, Arjun fails as a director. Despite the good storyline, he struggles to keep the audience involved. The real issue seems lost in all the unnecessary twists and drama surrounding the characters. Patriotic action dramas have been his forte, but Jai Hind 2 neither creates empathy for the characters and their situation, nor has entertainment value".

Kannada version 
Abhimanyu received positive reviews from critics. 

Bangalore Mirror wrote, "Abhimanyu may not be unique in how the story is told, but the idea is novel and is appealing enough". Indiaglitz gave 8 out of 10 and wrote, "Terrific action, tolerable narration, appealing in contents – Arjun Sarja in his first direction in Kannada has given a ‘Paisa Vasool’ cinema Abhimanyu". The New Indian Express wrote  "Abhimanyu is a taut action film with a strong social message. The subject would not have lost its grip if he was a little focussed on what exactly he wanted to say. However, Arjun has put enough effort into the film to make it a worthy one-time watch".

References

External links
 

2014 films
Indian drama films
2010s Telugu-language films
2010s Kannada-language films
Indian sequel films
Indian multilingual films
2010s Tamil-language films
Films directed by Arjun Sarja
Films scored by Arjun Janya
Films shot in Bangkok
2014 multilingual films
Films shot in Mumbai